Kamran Madani (born September 9, 1996) is an American karateka. In 2019, he won, at first, the silver medal in the men's kumite 84 kg event at the Pan American Games held in Lima, Peru. This became the gold medal after Carlos Sinisterra of Columbia was disqualified for doping violations.

Career 

In 2018, he won the gold medal in the men's kumite 84 kg event at the World University Karate Championships held in Kobe, Japan.

He won the bronze medal in the men's kumite 75 kg event at the 2022 World Games held in Birmingham, United States.

Achievements

References

External links 
 

Living people
1996 births
Place of birth missing (living people)
American male karateka
Pan American Games medalists in karate
Pan American Games gold medalists for the United States
Medalists at the 2019 Pan American Games
Karateka at the 2019 Pan American Games
Competitors at the 2022 World Games
World Games medalists in karate
World Games bronze medalists
Sportspeople from Boulder, Colorado
21st-century American people